The 1960 Kentucky Derby was the 86th running of the Kentucky Derby. The race took place on May 7, 1960.

Full results

References

1960
Kentucky Derby
Derby
Kentucky
Kentucky Derby